Michael Brown (born July 19, 1963) is an American retired professional basketball player and D-league head coach and NBA assistant coach. A durable 6'10" power forward/center, he played at George Washington University in the early 1980s, where he received the nickname "The New Washington Monument."

After four years of college ball, Brown was selected by the Chicago Bulls in the third round of the 1985 NBA Draft. Brown would go on to play eleven seasons in the NBA, earning a reputation as a workhorse in the low post in limited minutes as a reserve as a member of the Bulls, the Utah Jazz, the Minnesota Timberwolves, the Philadelphia 76ers, and the Phoenix Suns.  He was a fan favorite in his five seasons in Utah, and was affectionately nicknamed "the Brown Bear" by Jazz announcer Hot Rod Hundley.  Brown retired with NBA career totals of 3,130 points and 2,762 rebounds. He also played professionally in Italy for Aurora Desio (1985–1986), Teamsystem Bologna (1995) and Viola Reggio Calabria (1996–1998).

Brown was an assistant coach for the Las Vegas Slam of the ABA for the 2001–02 season. From 2002 through 2004, he was an assistant coach for the National Basketball Development League's Roanoke Dazzle. In 2004, he replaced Jeff Capel as head coach of the D-League's Fayetteville Patriots.

During the 2007–08 NBA season, Brown worked as an assistant coach for the Chicago Bulls. He was signed primarily to work with the Bulls' young centers and power forwards.

Spouse: Esther Rodriguez Brown in (2000-present)

References

External links
 George Washington University Athletic Hall of Fame web page
 
 Italian League stats

1963 births
Living people
African-American basketball players
American expatriate basketball people in Greece
American expatriate basketball people in Italy
American expatriate basketball people in Spain
American men's basketball coaches
American men's basketball players
Basketball coaches from New Jersey
Basketball players from Newark, New Jersey
Bàsquet Manresa players
Centers (basketball)
Charlotte Hornets expansion draft picks
Chicago Bulls assistant coaches
Chicago Bulls draft picks
Chicago Bulls players
Club Ourense Baloncesto players
Fayetteville Patriots coaches
George Washington Colonials men's basketball players
Greek Basket League players
Harlem Globetrotters players
Liga ACB players
Minnesota Timberwolves players
Philadelphia 76ers players
Phoenix Suns players
Power forwards (basketball)
Roanoke Dazzle coaches
Sportspeople from East Orange, New Jersey
Utah Jazz players